The 136th New York State Legislature, consisting of the New York State Senate and the New York State Assembly, met from January 1 to December 12, 1913, while William Sulzer, and then Martin H. Glynn, were Governor of New York, in Albany.

Background
Under the provisions of the New York Constitution of 1894, re-apportioned in 1906 and 1907, 51 Senators and 150 assemblymen were elected in single-seat districts; senators for a two-year term, assemblymen for a one-year term. The senatorial districts were made up of entire counties, except New York County (twelve districts), Kings County (eight districts), Erie County (three districts) and Monroe County (two districts). The Assembly districts were made up of contiguous area, all within the same county.

At this time there were two major political parties: the Republican Party and the Democratic Party. The Progressive Party, the Socialist Party, the Independence League, the Prohibition Party and the Socialist Labor Party also nominated tickets.

Elections
The New York state election, 1912, was held on November 5. Congressman William Sulzer and Martin H. Glynn were elected Governor and Lieutenant Governor; both Democrats. The other seven statewide elective offices up for election were also carried by the Democrats. The approximate party strength at this election, as expressed by the vote for governor, was: Democrats 650,000; Republicans 444,000; Progressives-Independence League 393,000; Socialists 57,000; Prohibition 19,000; and Socialist Labor 4,000.

Sessions
The Legislature met for the regular session at the State Capitol in Albany on January 1, 1913; and adjourned on May 2.

Al Smith (D) was elected Speaker with 102 votes against 42 for Harold J. Hinman (R) and 3 for Michael Schaap (P).

Robert F. Wagner (D) was re-elected President pro tempore of the State Senate.

The Legislature met for a special session at the State Capitol in Albany on June 16. This session was called by Governor Sulzer to try again to amend the primary election law. Instead, the legislators formed a committee to investigate Sulzer. On August 13, Governor Sulzer was impeached by the Assembly with a vote of 79 to 45. Lt. Gov. Glynn then claimed to be Acting Governor, but was contested by Sulzer. After some days, the courts recognized Glynn as Acting Governor, pending the verdict of the impeachment trial.

The Legislature took a recess on August 28; and met again on September 17.

On September 18, 1913, the New York Court for the Trial of Impeachments met in the Senate chamber at the State Capitol in Albany. The trial ended on October 12 with the conviction, and removal from office, of Governor William Sulzer. Lt. Gov. Martin H. Glynn succeeded to the governor's office for the remainder of the term; and President pro tem Robert F. Wagner became Acting Lieutenant Governor.

The Legislature took a recess on October 22; met again on November 10 and took a recess the same day; met again on December 8; and finally adjourned on December 12. On the last day, a Workmen's Compensation Bill was passed.

State Senate

Districts

Senators
The asterisk (*) denotes members of the previous Legislature who continued in office as members of this Legislature. John C. Fitzgerald, James A. Foley, John J. Boylan, George A. Blauvelt, John D. Stivers, George H. Whitney, Clayton L. Wheeler, Thomas B. Wilson, John Seeley and Gottfried H. Wende changed from the Assembly to the Senate.

Note: For brevity, the chairmanships omit the words "...the Committee on (the)..."

Employees
 Clerk: Patrick E. McCabe
 Sergeant-at-Arms: Henry W. Doll
 Stenographer: William F. MacReynolds

State Assembly
Note: For brevity, the chairmanships omit the words "...the Committee on (the)..."

Assemblymen

Employees
 Clerk: George R. Van Namee
 Sergeant-at-Arms: Lee F. Betts
 Principal Doorkeeper: Charles Durham
 First Assistant Doorkeeper: William Davis
 Second Assistant Doorkeeper: John W. Doty
 Stenographer: Martin Leach

Notes

Sources
 MEMBERS OF THE NEW YORK STATE SENATE (for the next session), in The Cornell Daily Sun (Volume XXXIII, Number 76) on December 21, 1912
 LEGISLATURE WON BY THE DEMOCRATS in NYT on November 6, 1912
 FIGHT AMONG REPUBLICANS in NYT on January 1, 1913
 LEGISLATIVE PLUMS SEIZED BY TAMMANY in NYT on January 7, 1913
 Journal of the Assembly (136th Session) (1913, Vol. I; from January 1 to March 18)
 Journal of the Assembly (136th Session) (1913, Vol. IV; Appendix)
 Proceedings in the Court for the Trial of Impeachments in the Matter of the Impeachment of William Sulzer, Governor of the State (1913)

136
1913 in the United States
1913 in New York (state)
1913 U.S. legislative sessions